Piru is a village in the Aurangabad district in Bihar, India.
Banbhat who was noble in the court of Harshvardhan belongs to Piru.

References
 Er Faizullah Khan Ajmeri

Villages in Aurangabad district, Bihar